Samuel Walter Willet Pickup (March 1, 1859 – November 15, 1935) was a Canadian farmer, merchant, shipbuilder, shipowner, and politician.

Born in Granville Ferry, Annapolis County, Nova Scotia, the son of Samuel Pickup, of English Loyalist descent, and Cyline G. Willett Pickup, his wife, of French Huguenot Loyalist descent, Pickup was educated in the Common Schools and at Mount Allison College (now Mount Allison University) in Sackville, New Brunswick. A merchant, farmer, shipbuilder, and shipowner, Pickup was a member of the Municipal Council for Annapolis County for eighteen years, during three years of which he was Warden of the County. He was elected to the House of Commons of Canada for the electoral district of Annapolis in the 1904 federal election. A Liberal, he was re-elected in 1908 and was defeated in 1911. He was defeated again in the 1930 federal election. In 1913, he was appointed to the Legislative Council of Nova Scotia, which was abolished in 1928.

electoral record

References
 The Canadian Parliament; biographical sketches and photo-engravures of the senators and members of the House of Commons of Canada. Being the tenth Parliament, elected November 3, 1904
 

1859 births
1935 deaths
Liberal Party of Canada MPs
Members of the House of Commons of Canada from Nova Scotia
Nova Scotia Liberal Party MLCs
People from Annapolis County, Nova Scotia